Imam Quli may refer to:
 Imam Quli (given name)
 Emam Qoli, Kermanshah
 Emamqoli, Lorestan
 Emamqoli, Razavi Khorasan

Other
 İmamqulukənd